Head over Heels is a 2012 British stop motion animated short film written and directed by Timothy Reckart.  The film was nominated for Best Animated Short Film for the 85th Academy Awards.  It also won the first Annie Award for Best Student film and the Cartoon d'Or for Best European Animated Short.

After being nominated for an Academy Award the film was released along with all the other 15 Oscar-nominated short films in theaters by ShortsHD.

In March 2015, the film was posted online together with special features at www.headoverheels.tv.

Plot
After many years of marriage, husband and wife Walter and Madge have grown apart: he lives on the floor and she lives on the ceiling. They live separate, parallel lives, never talking, barely even looking at each other. When Walter tries to reignite their old romance, it brings their love crashing down, and the couple who can't agree which way is up must find a way to put their marriage back together.

Awards
40th Annual Annie Awards, Best Student Film
Edinburgh International Film Festival, Short Animation, Nominated for Best Film in British Short Film Competition
Galway Film Fleadh, Cartoon Saloon Best First Animation Award
Anima Mundi, Rio de Janeiro & São Paulo, Brazil Short Animation, Best Film (Jury and Audience Award), Best Student Film (Audience Award)
Hiroshima International Animation Festival, Short Animation, Audience Prize
Encounters Short Film and Animation Festival, Short Animation, Nomination for Cartoon d'Or
St Petersburg Student Film Festival, Short Animation, Diploma for the Work of the Animation Artist
Animage Festival Pernambuco, Short Animation, Audience Award for Best Short Film
Festival du Film Britannique de Dinard, Best Short Film
Austin Film Festival, Best Animated Short, Audience Award for Animated Short
Heartland Film Festival, Best Short Film, Jimmy Stewart Memorial Crystal Heart Award
Cinanima Espinho, Short Animation, Special Jury Prize
Bath Film Festival, IMDb New Filmmaker Award
Fancine Málaga, Short Animation Best Animated Short (Jury Prize, Audience Prize and Youth Jury Prize)
Brazil Stop Motion Pernambuco, Best Student Film (Prix du Public)
Animpact Max Seoul, Audience Prize
Animateka International Animation Film Fest, Best European Student Film

Festivals
Cannes Film Festival, Cinefondation Category
SICAF Seoul, Graduation Films
Guanajuato International Film Festival, Short Animation
Molise Cinema Festival, Short Animation
KROK International Animated Film Festival, Short Animation
World Festival of Animated Film of Varna, Short Animation
Raindance Film Festival, Short film
Hamptons International Film Festival, Short film
Anim'est Bucharest, Audience Competition
Colchester Film Festival, Short Film
Kerry Film Festival, Short Animation
Warsaw Film Festival, Short Film
Montreal Stop Motion Film Festival, Short Animation
Razor Reel Fantastic Film Festival Bruges

Credits
Nigel Anthony as Walter
Rayyah McCaul as Madge
Puppet Fabricators- Sophie Huckfield and Charlie Buck (Arts University Bournemouth)
Cinematographer - Chloë Thomson 
Production Designer - Eleonore Cremonese    
Editor - James Taylor
Sound Designer - Axle Kith Cheeng
Music Composed & Performed by Jered Sorkin 
Special FX Supervisor - Jennifer Groves
Visual FX Supervisor - Helen Brownell
Production Manager - Lizzie Bull
Script Editor - Tom Hill
Produced by Fodhla Cronin O'Reilly
Written & Directed by Timothy Reckart

References

External links
Official website

British animated short films
2010s animated short films
2012 animated films
2012 films
Annie Award winners
2012 short films
2010s English-language films
2010s British films